Dark Matter is a science fiction series started in 2015 that was developed by Prodigy Pictures in association with the Space channel and the Syfy channel. The concept was created by Joseph Mallozzi and Paul Mullie while they were working on the Stargate franchise, and was originally published as a comic book series in 2012.

An order for 13 episodes was placed for the first season of the series, which premiered on June 12, 2015, on both Space and Syfy. On September 5, 2015, the series was renewed for a second season. Dark Matter was renewed for a third season in September 2016, which premiered on June 9, 2017. On September 1, 2017, Syfy canceled the series.

Premise
A group of people in stasis pods awaken aboard the starship Raza. They have no memories of who they are or their lives before awakening, so they assume the names One through Six in the order in which they left stasis and set about trying to uncover their identities and what happened to them. Also onboard is a female-looking android who possesses a wireless neural link to the ship.

At the end of the pilot episode, the crew discover that they are a band of mercenaries who are ranked among the worst criminals in the galaxy, leaving them with the dilemma of continuing their original selves' violent path or seeking redemption. Their lives are frequently complicated by secrets from their forgotten pasts.

Episodes

Cast and characters

Main
 Marc Bendavid as One / Jace Corso / Derrick Moss (season 1; recurring, season 2)
 Melissa O'Neil as Two / Portia Lin / Rebecca, the de facto captain of the Raza and leader of the crew both before and after the mindwipe
 Anthony Lemke as Three / Marcus Boone / Titch 
 Alex Mallari Jr. as Four / Ryo Tetsudo / Ishida Ryo, the exiled heir to the throne of the Principality of Zairon
 Jodelle Ferland as Five / Das / Emily Kolburn, the youngest member of the crew and the only one not wanted for capital crimes
 Roger Cross as Six / Griffin Jones / Lt. Kal Varrick 
 Zoie Palmer as The Android / Suki. Palmer also plays the Android's creator Dr. Irena Shaw in the third season.
 Melanie Liburd as Nyx Harper (season 2; guest, season 3), a new crewmember in the second season on the run from the rest of her people, the Seers
 Shaun Sipos as Devon Taltherd (season 2), a disgraced doctor and new crewmember in the second season

Recurring

 David Hewlett as Tabor Calchek, the crew's unreliable handler and "talent" agent
 Jeff Teräväinen as Lt. John Anders, a Galactic Authority officer and former partner of Six 
 Torri Higginson as Commander Delaney Truffault of the Mikkei Combine, an occasional ally
 David Richmond-Peck as Commander Nieman of Ferrous Corp
 Natalie Brown as Sarah, Marcus Boone's lover. Though she dies of an incurable illness in season 1, in season 3 the Android finds her consciousness had been digitally uploaded into the Razas server.
 Ellen Wong as Misaki Han-Shireikan, commander of the Ishida Royal Guard and childhood friend of Ryo (seasons 2–3)
 Ennis Esmer as Wexler, a manic sociopath and the leader of a mercenary group who are hired by Delaney Truffault to work with the Raza crew but prove untrustworthy. Although Wexler is killed during season 1, an alternate reality version of him returns in seasons 2 and 3, from a universe where the Raza were never mindwiped and are still villains, with the crew consisting of Portia Lin, Marcus Boone, Jace Corso, Wexler and Tash. This version is significantly less brutal and ultimately sides with the main-universe crew.
 Mike Dopud as Arax Nero, the leader of a prison gang (season 2)
 Kris Holden-Ried as Galactic Authority Inspector Kyle Kierken (season 2)
 Brendan Murray as Victor, leader of a group of rogue androids and love interest for the Raza'''s Android (seasons 2–3)
 Andrew Moodie as Teku Fonsei. Ryo appoints Teku, his former teacher, as his advisor (season 3).
 Mishka Thébaud as Adrian Maro, former assistant to Calchek, who travels with the crew of the Raza during the first half of season 3
 Ayisha Issa as Solara Shockley, Maro's bodyguard, who also travels with the crew until she leaves with Adrian (season 3)
 Wil Wheaton as Alex Rook, President and CEO of Dwarf Star Technologies

Guest
 Andrew Jackson as The General, the leader of the rebel group Procyon Insurrection to which Six once belonged
 Amanda Brugel as Keeley, a miner the Raza crew encounter on a mission
 Ruby Rose as Wendy, an entertainment model android
 Rachael Ancheril as Della, a colonist on a planet oppressed by Traugott Corporation
 Dan Jeannotte as Derrick Moss, One's original identity before assuming that of Jace Corso
 Jessica Sipos as Tash, a member of Wexler's mercenary group. Although Tash is killed during season 1, an alternate reality version of her returns in seasons 2 and 3 as part of the parallel Raza crew.
 Jon Cor as Vons, a member of Wexler's mercenary group, who may be Tash's brother, lover or both - they don't subscribe to "outdated social categories"
 Conrad Pla as Cain, a member of Wexler's mercenary group
 Kerr Hewitt as Sgt. Voss, a Ferrous Corp soldier who serves aboard the FCS Deliverance Franka Potente as Chief Inspector Shaddick of the Galactic Authority's Serious Crimes Division (season 2)
 Inga Cadranel as Alicia Reynaud, a businesswoman who wants what Emily Kolburn (Five) stole (season 2)

Production
Principal photography for the first season began in Toronto, Ontario, Canada, on January 9, 2015, and concluded May 20, 2015.

On September 1, 2015, Syfy renewed Dark Matter for a second season. Chris Regina, Syfy's senior VP of program strategy, said that "With its mysterious premise and fascinating characters, Dark Matter has built an incredibly loyal, passionate and engaged fan base. We look forward to another out-of-this-world season from this talented creative team." Production on the second season began on December 9, 2015, and concluded May 6, 2016. 

The third season began production on November 18, 2016. Dark Matter's third season would be its last and the show's cancellation was announced in September 2017. According to Mallozzi in various interviews, the show was picked up by Syfy's acquisition division in New York, but it wasn't well received by the network's original programming division in Los Angeles. In addition, while the series was outperforming several Syfy first-run programs, the network wasn't able to monetize the show because it was an acquisition.

BroadcastDark Matter'' premiered on Syfy in the United States on the same day as Canada.  Within the following week, the series premiered on Syfy Australia and Syfy UK – on June 13 and 16, 2015,  respectively.

Reception
As of 21 March 2022, review aggregation website Rotten Tomatoes gave season 1 an approval rating of 68%, with an average rating of 5/10 based on reviews from 19 critics. The sites consensus statement says: "... [the] premiere benefits from likable characters and a concluding twist, but its gaping plot holes and worn premise add up to an aimless episode." Metacritic gave the series an average score of 58 out of 100, based on reviews from 5 critics, indicating "Mixed or average reviews". On Rotten Tomatoes season 2 received a 100% rating based on 7 reviews, and season 3 also received a 100% rating based on 7 reviews.

Ratings
The series premiere pulled 273,000 overnight viewers on the Space channel in Canada, and 1.28 million viewers for its premiere on the Syfy channel in the U.S.

See also
 List of science fiction television programs
 List of science fiction TV and radio shows produced in Canada

References

External links

 

Television shows based on Dark Horse Comics
2015 Canadian television series debuts
2017 Canadian television series endings
2010s Canadian science fiction television series
English-language television shows
Television shows filmed in Toronto
Dystopian television series
Space adventure television series
Television series about cloning
Television series set on fictional planets
Androids in television
Fiction about amnesia
CTV Sci-Fi Channel original programming
Television series set in the future